This is a list of endangered flora of the Warren region, a biogeographic region or bioregion in southern Western Australia. It includes all taxa that occur in the region, and that have been classified as "R: Declared Rare Flora - Extant Taxa" or "X: Declared Rare Flora - Presumed Extinct Taxa" under the Department of Environment and Conservation's Declared Rare and Priority Flora List, and are hence gazetted as endangered extant flora under the Wildlife Conservation Act 1950.

There are 28 endangered taxa. Leucopogon cryptanthus is presumed extinct. The other 27 are believed extant:
 Asplenium obtusatum subsp. northlandicum
 Banksia brownii (Feather-leaved Banksia)
 Banksia verticillata (Albany Banksia)
 Boronia exilis
 Brachyscias verecundus
 Caladenia christineae
 Caladenia excelsa
 Caladenia harringtoniae
 Caladenia winfieldii
 Calectasia cyanea (Blue Tinsel Lily)
 Darwinia ferricola ms
 Diuris drummondii (Tall Donkey Orchid)
 Drakaea micrantha
 Dryandra nivea subsp. uliginosa
 Epiblema grandiflorum var. cyaneum ms (Blue Babe-in-a-cradle)
 Grevillea brachystylis subsp. australis
 Hydatella dioica (Swan Hydatella)
 Isopogon uncinatus 
 Kennedia glabrata (Northcliffe Kennedia)
 Kennedia lateritia (Augusta Kennedia)
 Lambertia orbifolia subsp. Scott River Plains
 Meziella trifida
 Microtis globula (South-coast Mignonette Orchid)
 Reedia spathacea
 Sphenotoma drummondii (Mountain Paper-heath)
 Verticordia fimbrilepis subsp. australis
 Verticordia plumosa var. vassensis

References

 
Lists of plants of Australia
-
Nature conservation in Western Australia
Endemic flora of Australia
Flora, Warren
Lists of biota of Western Australia